During the 1892–93 Scottish football season, Celtic competed in the Scottish Football League.

Results

Pre-season and friendlies

Scottish Football League

Scottish Cup

Glasgow Cup

Glasgow Merchants Charity Cup

References

Scottish football championship-winning seasons
Celtic F.C. seasons
Celtic